Dingo attacks on humans are rare in Australia, and when they do occur are generally on young children. However, dingoes are much more of a danger to livestock, especially to sheep and young cattle. The  Dingo Fence was constructed in Southeast Australia to protect the livestock there from attacks.

Wild dogs are fairly large predators, but are much smaller than able-bodied adults and therefore not generally much of a threat to them. However, they can be a serious threat to incapacitated, isolated, outnumbered, or very small humans, especially infants and young children.

Humans and dingoes generally tend to avoid each other. In some situations, however, such as on K'gari and some locations in the Northern Territory, close interaction between dingoes and humans, especially feeding dingoes, has led to dangerous habituation and attacks.

Dingo attacks on livestock, however, are fairly common occurrences and a serious concern for the Australian livestock industry.

Cause

The likelihood of wild dog attacks on humans depends to a large degree on how humans behave toward them. The more frequently these dogs are fed or scavenge human leftovers, the more likely it is that they lose all caution and sometimes react aggressively towards humans when they perceive themselves to be in conflict with the human. During a study on K'gari dingoes, the researchers reasoned that the presence of humans influences the activity of dingoes. The tourism industry on the island encouraged people to approach dingoes without caution, and such encounters were practically expected by the tourists. People lost their caution when dealing with dingoes more and more frequently, and the number of reported interactions increased. The way the dingoes reacted towards humans was dependent on the way humans behaved toward them. Dingoes tended to show aggressive behaviour when humans fled, and tended to be intimidated when humans consciously or aggressively moved towards them. Humans making submissive postures seemed to cause a neutral or submissive reaction of the dingoes. That dingoes showed aggressive behaviour towards humans seemed to be similarly likely during different times of the year. However, adult dingoes might be more dangerous during the breeding season, and female dingoes especially when they raise their pups.

Even when habituation to humans seems to be the cause for attacks, it is not clear what the ultimate cause for attacks and overall threat towards humans is. It is possible that some attacks result from the "play" of young pups, especially with children. Attacks can also be caused by false reactions of humans to aggressive and dominance behaviour of dingoes. It is assumed that dingoes might have started to regard "human" food sources (garbage cans, leftovers, handouts, etc.) as part of their territory and that attacks on humans can therefore occur because the dingoes see humans as competitors and want to protect their food sources. That some dingoes might regard humans as prey was also deemed possible because humans, especially children, could be theoretically overpowered.

Some tourists seemed confused by the high numbers of rules in some parks and in some cases have been observed to actively feed the wild animals.

Cases

In December 1933, when three girls went missing near Mount Coot-tha, the possibility of their having been attacked by dingoes was considered. Local livestock men who live and work among dingoes all their lives, said that they had no direct knowledge of any dingo attacks on humans, but from what they knew of the animal, they reasoned that a starving dingo would attack a defenseless human. Some had heard of human remains found scattered by dingoes. Scholarly experts couldn't comment due to contradictory evidence. The three girls were found unharmed two days later. Dingoes played no part in their disappearance.

The first well-documented case of a dingo attack on K'gari is from 1988. As early as 60 years before, a newspaper account reported of problems with dingoes. Between 1996 and 2001, 279 incidents with dingoes were reported, of which 39 were assessed as "major" and one as "catastrophic".

Three reports of dingo attacks on humans caused special attention:
 On 19 August 1980 a nine-week-old girl named Azaria Chamberlain was taken by one or more dingoes near Uluru. Her mother was suspected and convicted of murder. Four years later she was released from prison when the jacket of the baby was found near Uluru. This incident caused much outcry for and against the dingoes. The story was adapted into a film named Evil Angels (also known as A Cry in the Dark) starring Meryl Streep. In 2012 a coroner concluded that sufficient evidence existed to confirm a dingo attack as cause of Azaria Chamberlain's death.
 On 30 April 2001 nine-year-old Clinton Gage was attacked and killed by two dingoes near Waddy Point on K'gari. The incident and the following culling of 31 dingoes caused much outcry among the residents. There were many protests and the suggestion was made to erect fences. The incident seemed to have had only a low impact on the tourism industry, and some tourists even felt safer due to the increased presence of rangers.
 In November 2012, a six-month-old dingo known as Inky was killed by rangers on K'gari after continued aggressive and dangerous behaviour towards people. The threatening behaviour included "lunging" at a family, coming out of the bushland at high speed towards volleyball players, and grabbing two tourists on separate occasions with his mouth, not breaking the skin on either occasion. Rangers attempted to trap the dangerous dingo for a month before they were successful. The captured animal was then euthanised. One Dingo advocacy group argued that, as a juvenile, the dingo's aggressive behaviours would be considered normal for his young age. Soon after, Inky's brother Byron was killed by rangers, although his documented incidents never reached the serious Code E level that his brother's had.

Attacks on humans

Below is a partial list of dingo attacks and alleged dingo attacks that occurred in Australia, in reverse chronological order.

Attacks on other animals

Dingos frequently prey on sheep, goats and cattle when they have the chance. Because of this, the Dingo Fence, one of the longest structures in the world, was constructed to limit dingo migration into agricultural regions. Cattle are usually quite capable of defending themselves against dog attacks and the losses for cattle owners are therefore usually low, but sheep are extremely vulnerable and their behaviour in the presence of a predator can often lead to surplus killing. Some notable dingo attacks on animals which have appeared in reliable sources:

Conclusions
Articles published about dingo attacks blame them on habituation, especially through the intentional and unintentional feeding of dingoes. The more frequently these animals are fed or allowed to scavenge on waste food, the more likely they are to react aggressively towards humans when they no longer receive or find food. It is further thought that dingoes might have started to regard the food sources found (garbage cans, leftovers and handouts) as part of their territory. Attacks then occur with humans seen as competition, and dingoes simply reacting to protect their food supply.

Even when habituation to humans seems to be the general cause for attacks, it is not absolutely clear, and therefore the overall threat towards people is not known for sure. Some attacks might result from the "play" of young pups, especially with children. Attacks can also be caused by mistaken reactions of humans to aggressive and dominant behaviour of dingoes. That some dingoes might regard humans as prey is a possibility, as children or incapacitated adults could be theoretically overpowered. Dr. Bradley Smith said that K'gari has a problem with humans and not with the dingoes, that dogs who were labelled "aggressive" were simply behaving naturally.

The behaviour of humans might undermine efforts to guard against dingo attacks. Therefore, the change in human behaviour is at the centre of attention. Warning signs like "Beware of Dingoes" seem to have lost their effect on K'gari, despite the high number of such signs. Furthermore, some humans do not realise how adaptive and quick dingoes are. Therefore, humans do not remain attentive enough. They do not consider, for instance, that dingoes steal food like fruits and vegetables. In addition, some tourists seemed to be confused by the high number of rules in some parks, and they have been prompted in some cases to actively feed the wild animals.

See also
 Coyote attack
 Dog attack
 Wolf attack

References

Animal attacks in Australia
Deaths due to dog attacks
Canid attacks
Canis lupus dingo